Hypatopa silvestrella is a moth in the family Blastobasidae. It was described by Vladimir Ivanovitsch Kuznetsov in 1984. It is found in Russia.

References

Hypatopa
Moths described in 1984